Helicopter Combat Support Squadron 1 (HC-1) was a helicopter squadron of the United States Navy operating several helicopter types in support of United States Pacific Fleet ships and other units. The squadron was established on 1 April 1948 and disestablished on 29 April 1994. It was nicknamed  "Pacific Fleet Angels" or just "Angels".

History
Early experience with helicopters by the Navy was developed by Helicopter Development Squadron THREE (VX-3) which operated out of Naval Air Station Lakehurst, New Jersey. This led to the creation of the service's first two designated helicopter squadrons, Helicopter Utility Squadron (HU-1) and HU-2 on 1 April 1948.

As the Navy changed the scope of roles for its utility helicopter squadrons, it also re-designated them Helicopter Combat Support Squadrons. HU-1 was duly re-designated HC-1 on 1 July 1965.

A detachment of HC-1 participated in Operation Desert Storm aboard  and during its return played a key role assisting civilians in aftermath of the 1991 Bangladesh cyclone.

The squadron was disestablished on 29 April 1994.

Equipment
The squadron has operated several types during its history:

 Sikorsky HO3S
 Sikorsky HO4S
 Piasecki HUP Retriever
 Sikorsky UH-34D/E Seahorse
 Kaman UH-2A/B/C Seasprite
 Boeing-Vertol UH-46 Sea Knight
 Sikorsky SH-3G/UH-3H Sea King
 Sikorsky CH-53E Super Stallion

See also
 History of the United States Navy
 List of inactive United States Navy aircraft squadrons

References

External links 
 

01
01